The  is a two-car electric multiple unit (EMU) train type operated by the private railway operator Nankai Electric Railway in Japan since 2005.

Design
The 2300 series design was developed from the earlier 2000 series EMUs first introduced in 1990. The car bodies are stainless steel, with fibre-reinforced plastic (FRP) cab ends.

Formation
As of 1 April 2012, the fleet consists of four two-car sets formed as shown below.

The two cars are each fitted with one single-arm pantograph.

Each set has a sticker depicting a different flower on the body side as follows.
 2301: Cherry blossom
 2302: Flowering dogwood
 2303: Rhododendron
 2304: Cosmos

Interior
Passenger accommodation consists of transverse seating arranged 2+1 abreast with seat backs that can be flipped over to face the direction of travel, and longitudinal bench seats at the ends of the cars.

References

External links

 Nankai 2300 series (Japan Railfan Magazine Online) 

Electric multiple units of Japan
Train-related introductions in 2004
Nankai Electric Railway rolling stock
Tokyu Car multiple units
1500 V DC multiple units of Japan